The Subversive Activities Control Board (SACB) was a United States government committee to investigate Communist infiltration of American society during the 1950s Red Scare. It was the subject of a landmark United States Supreme Court decision of the Warren Court, Communist Party v. Subversive Activities Control Board, 351 U.S. 115 (1956), that would lead to later decisions that rendered the Board powerless.

It was organized on November 1, 1950, under authority provided in the McCarran Internal Security Act. The original 5 members of the panel were Seth W. Richardson of Washington, D.C., the Board's Chairman, along with Peter Campbell Brown of New York, Charles M. LaFollette of Indiana, David J. Coddaire of Massachusetts, and Dr. Kathryn McHale of Indiana.  Mr. Brown later served as Chairman in 1952 and 1953.

The SACB was empowered to order the registration of organizations that it found to be "Communist fronts", "Communist action" groups or "Communist infiltrated" groups:

In carrying out this mandate, the SACB was a leader in the U.S. government's response to the Red Scare. The SACB's proceedings were thorough and methodical. Hundreds of witnesses testified and were cross-examined by defense lawyers. The decisions and findings of the SACB were subject to judicial review.

In 1955, President Dwight D. Eisenhower appointed former Arkansas Governor Francis Cherry as SACB director. The appointment was continued by Presidents John F. Kennedy and Lyndon B. Johnson. However, the 1965 U.S. Supreme Court Albertson v. Subversive Activities Control Board case eliminated the SACB's authority to enforce Communist registration requirements.

The Subversive Activities Control Board was officially abolished by Congress in 1972.

See also
House Un-American Activities Committee
Howard D. Abramowitz

References

Archive
LexisNexis: Archive
United States Subversive Activities Control Board Records. 1953. 2 microfilm reels (1 negative, 1 positive). At the Labor Archives of Washington, University of Washington Libraries Special Collections.

McCarthyism
United States national commissions
Anti-communist organizations in the United States
1950 establishments in the United States